Rafiel may refer to:

 Jason Rafiel, a character in A Caribbean Mystery by Agatha Christie
 Michael Rafiel, a character in Nemesis by Agatha Christie
 Rafiel is a character in the video game Fire Emblem: Radiant Dawn

See also
 Raphael (disambiguation)